Alloway is an unincorporated community and census-designated place (CDP) located within Alloway Township, in Salem County, New Jersey, United States. As of the 2010 United States Census, the CDP's population was 1,402.

Geography
Alloway CDP is located at  (39.561534,-75.34928). According to the United States Census Bureau, Alloway had a total area of 7.122 square miles (18.445 km2), including 6.868 square miles (17.788 km2) of land and 0.254 square miles (0.657 km2) of water (3.56%).

Demographics

Census 2010

Census 2000
As of the 2000 United States Census there were 1,128 people, 391 households, and 299 families living in the CDP. The population density was 62.5/km2 (161.9/mi2). There were 406 housing units at an average density of 22.5/km2 (58.3/mi2). The racial makeup of the CDP was 93.09% White, 4.34% African American, 0.71% Native American, 0.09% Asian, 0.00% Pacific Islander, 0.35% from other races, and 1.42% from two or more races. 1.06% of the population were Hispanic or Latino of any race.

There were 391 households, out of which 33.0% had children under the age of 18 living with them, 63.4% were married couples living together, 9.0% had a female householder with no husband present, and 23.5% were non-families. 20.5% of all households were made up of individuals, and 10.2% had someone living alone who was 65 years of age or older. The average household size was 2.68 and the average family size was 3.07.

In the CDP the population was spread out, with 28.5% under the age of 18, 6.9% from 18 to 24, 26.2% from 25 to 44, 24.3% from 45 to 64, and 14.1% who were 65 years of age or older. The median age was 38 years. For every 100 females, there were 104.7 males. For every 100 females age 18 and over, there were 99.3 males.

The median income for a household in the CDP was $56,477, and the median income for a family was $66,346. Males had a median income of $40,357 versus $32,083 for females. The per capita income for the town was $25,121. 11.2% of the population and 4.4% of families were below the poverty line. Out of the total people living in poverty, 10.5% are under the age of 18 and 11.8% are 65 or older.

References

Alloway Township, New Jersey
Census-designated places in Salem County, New Jersey